Foley Meir Football Club is a football club based in Stoke-on-Trent, England. They are currently members of the North West Counties League Division One South and play at Whitcombe Road, Stoke-on-Trent.

History
Founded as Foley in 1947 by ex-servicemen, the club initially joined the Longton League Division Two. In 1996, the club joined the Midland League Division Two, winning the league at the first attempt. In 2005, following the Midland League's merger with the Staffordshire County League, the club became founder members of the Staffordshire County Senior League. In 2022, the club was admitted into the North West Counties League Division One South.

Ground
The club's first ground was The Open Holes in Fenton. In 1982, the club moved to their current ground in Whitcombe Road, Stoke-on-Trent.

References

Sport in Stoke-on-Trent
Association football clubs established in 1947
1947 establishments in England
Football clubs in England
Football clubs in Staffordshire
Staffordshire County League
Midland Football League (1994)
Staffordshire County Senior League
North West Counties Football League clubs